Marvel Masterworks is an American collection of hardcover and trade paperback comic book reprints published by Marvel Comics, with the main goal of republishing classic Marvel Comics storylines in a hardcover, premium edition, often with restored artwork and better graphical quality when compared to other Marvel collected editions. The collection started in 1987, with volumes reprinting the issues of The Amazing Spider-Man, The Fantastic Four, The X-Men, and The Avengers. The Masterworks line has expanded from such reprints of the 1960s period that fans and historians call the Silver Age of Comic Books to include the 1930s–1940s Golden Age; comics of Marvel's 1950s pre-Code forerunner, Atlas Comics; and even some reprints from the 1970s period called the Bronze Age of Comic Books.

Rival DC Comics would launch a similar line the DC Archive Editions in 1989, the equivalent of the Marvel Masterworks.

History

First series (1987–1993)
The first printing of Masterworks books from Marvel started in 1987 (three in 1987, four per year after that) and continued until 1994 (27 volumes), most with a suggested retail price of US $29.95 (Hulk $24.95) for the first three years, $34.95 after that (Silver Surfer Vol. 19 $44.95). The first printings had a marble-look dust jacket with either light gray, pastels or primary colors; the binding was a faux leather dyed in the color associated with the title (Marvel Masterworks, volume number, and title was embossed usually in gold (exceptions: The Silver Surfer, Iron Man) on the spine along with an embossed symbol representing the character(s) of the title on the front) and numbered in the order the volumes were released (e.g., The Amazing Spider-Man Vol. 1 was #1, The Fantastic Four Vol. 1 was #2). Volumes contained about 10 issues (plus one Annual) and were about 220-260 pages each. Some volumes had fewer pages, such as The Invincible Iron Man Vol. 1 (197 pages), The Incredible Hulk Vol. 1 (150 pages), and The Uncanny X-Men Vol. 1-3 (each under 200 pages). The end papers featured a "gallery" of three sequential Masterworks covers, along with a partial cover of the next volume in the series (except Volumes 1, 2 and 27). The volume in which the "gallery" was printed would always "hang" in the third position, preceded by the previous two volumes. Some volumes have had multiple printings, such as The Amazing Spider-Man Vol. 1, with seven.

Trade paperbacks (1992–1993)
Also during the original Marvel Masterworks run between 1992 and 1993, Marvel Comics had published lower-priced trade paperback editions of selected volumes in the Masterworks line, but these versions only reprinted half of the contents compared to the hardcover editions. These were:

 The Amazing Spider-Man Masterworks Vol. 1 (March 1992) - Reprints Amazing Fantasy #15, The Amazing Spider-Man #1-5
 The Avengers Masterworks Vol. 1 (October 1993) - Reprints The Avengers #1-5
 The Uncanny X-Men Masterworks Vol. 1 (March 1993) - Reprints The Uncanny X-Men #1-5
 The All-New, All Different X-Men Masterworks Vol. 1 (August 1993) - Reprints Giant-Size X-Men #1, The Uncanny X-Men #94-97

Even though on the cover each book was labeled as Volume 1, no subsequent volumes were ever published for these trade paperbacks. Marvel did not try trade paperback versions of the Masterworks again until 2002 and 2009.

Second series (1997–2002)
From 1994 to 1996, no new Masterworks were published, and existing volumes did not get additional printings.  Following this, from 1997 to 2002, the Masterworks line was revived, when some of the original 27 went back into print with a new style of dust jacket designed by Comicraft, and without the chronological numbering on the spine. Instead, the line used the number of the volume for each particular comic book series. Four new Masterworks were published from 2000 to 2002, bringing the total then to 31. Only 10 volumes were published in total from this initial relaunch, and they were Marvel Masterworks: The Fantastic Four Vol. 1 and Vol. 6, Marvel Masterworks: Daredevil Vol. 1 and Vol. 2, Marvel Masterworks: The Mighty Thor Vol. 1 and Vol. 3, Marvel Masterworks: X-Men Vol. 1 and Vol. 3, Marvel Masterworks: The Amazing Spider-Man Vol. 1, and Marvel Masterworks: The Avengers Vol. 1. They are now out of print.

Relaunch (2003 - present)
With The Sub-Mariner Vol. 1, the 32nd Masterwork, Marvel relaunched the line with silver dust jackets in 2003. On the front cover dust jacket, these initial releases had the book's interior contents and creator names on the top of the front cover art image, and the Marvel Masterworks name under the cover art on the bottom, with the volume number on the spine featured in a black-filled square with silver edging, with a silver font labeling the volume number. Post-2003 afterward, Marvel redesigned the look: the Masterworks name with the title and volume number now up on top of the cover image, with the interior contents and creator names listed at the bottom of the cover art, and the dust jacket spine numbering filled in a silver square with black lettering font labeling the volume number. From 2002 to 2004, Marvel brought the 31 now-out-of-print volumes back into print, all with the new silver dust jackets. Like the other releases from 1997 on, these dust jackets do not have the chronological numbering. Upon their initial release, however, a limited print run (about 1,000 to 1,500) was produced with variant dust jackets that used the original marble-look style and retained the absolute chronological numbering (only on the dust jacket's spine). These carried a $5 higher suggested retail price than the regular editions (typically US $54.99).

Some changes were made for the new second editions, with some issues/covers re-colored, previously unreprinted pin-up pages added, and some issues were moved between volumes (Annual issues were amongst the changes made, as Marvel wanted to do a more accurate chronological reprinting of their history than the Masterworks series had previously attained).

Starting with the 33rd volume, The Amazing Spider-Man Vol. 6 (April 2004), Marvel started producing new Masterworks once again, continuing monthly from August 2004. These new books have also been printed with both regular and variant/original cover styles.

Trade paperbacks (Barnes & Noble, 2002)
In 2002, Marvel partnered with Barnes & Noble to produce lower-priced trade paperback (typically US $12.95) versions of selected Masterworks volumes. Twelve were produced, without dust jackets, and they utilized the silver cover scheme (based on the initial 2002 dust jacket design prior to the 2003 revamping layout).

Trade paperbacks (2009–2015 editions)
In 2008 (and starting in 2009), Marvel moved their printing plant to China and reprint the Masterworks as a trade paperback line for the third time in celebration of the publisher's then-70th anniversary year, reprinting the Masterworks monthly in the same sequence as they were originally released in the hardcover editions. Like the post-2003 remastered hardcovers relaunch, this trade paperback line also had both regular and limited alternate variant covers that used the original 1987 marble-look style. This series of trade paperbacks reprinted in order of the original hardback releases from The Amazing Spider-Man Vol. 1 to Warlock Vol. 1. The Marvel Masterworks trade paperback series was discontinued in 2015 and somewhat replaced by the new Epic Collection trade paperback series, which began in 2014.

Mighty Marvel Masterworks trade paperbacks (2021 - present)
Beginning in June 2021, Marvel started releasing a new trade paperback line called Mighty Marvel Masterworks. Originally nicknamed as Junior Masterworks, they aim to reprint classic stories in an affordable price for young readers, as to capitalize on the growing popularity of super-hero media, so the trim size is smaller than the average comic book trade (6" by 9"), resembling a Manga volume.

Golden Age Masterworks (2004-2012)
In October 2004, Marvel released its first Golden Age collection, Golden Age: Marvel Comics Vol. 1, launching a new line of Masterworks. This 1939 and 1940s line reprints material by Timely Comics, Marvel's Golden Age predecessor. It is differentiated from the 1960s Silver Age line by the words Golden Age on each title, and with the regular dust jacket colored gold rather than silver. From Golden Age: Captain America Vol. 1 (February 2005) onward, these volumes were released quarterly. The line was discontinued in 2012.

Atlas Era Masterworks (2006-2013)
In January 2006, with Atlas Era: Tales to Astonish Vol. 1, Marvel began publishing a third line of Masterworks, reprinting 1950s and early 1960s comics of Marvel forerunner company Atlas Comics. The regular editions of these volumes have red dust jackets instead of silver. The comics reprinted in these volumes were originally produced during a lull in superhero popularity. The initial Atlas Era Masterworks volumes were primarily science-fiction/fantasy stories, particularly featuring drive-in theater-style monsters. More recent volumes have included other genres, such as pre-Comics Code horror and jungle stories. Marvel started publishing the Atlas Era Masterworks volumes semi-annually, then quarterly before returning to semi-annual. The line was discontinued in 2013.

Alphabetical list of Marvel Masterworks
{|wikitable width=100%
 |
Golden Age (30)
All-Winners Vol. 1–4
Captain America 
Daring Mystery Vol. 1–2
Human Torch 
Marvel Comics 
Mystic Comics Vol. 1
Sub-Mariner 
U.S.A. Comics Vol. 1–2
Young Allies Vol. 1–2

Atlas Era (28)
Battlefield Vol. 1
Black Knight/Yellow Claw 
Heroes Vol. 1–3
Journey into Mystery Vol. 1–4
Jungle Adventures Vol. 1–3
Menace Vol. 1
Strange Tales Vol. 1–6
Tales of Suspense Vol. 1–4
Tales to Astonish Vol. 1–4
Venus Vol. 1

| valign=top |
Marvel Age (295)
The Amazing Spider-Man 
Ant-Man/Giant-Man 
The Avengers Vol. 1–23
Black Panther Vol. 1–3
Brother Voodoo Vol. 1
Captain America Vol. 1–15
Captain Marvel Vol. 1–6
The Champions Vol. 1
Daredevil Vol. 1–18
Dazzler Vol. 1–4
Deathlok Vol. 1
The Defenders Vol. 1–8
Doctor Strange Vol. 1–10
The Fantastic Four 
Ghost Rider Vol. 1-5
Howard the Duck Vol. 1–2
The Human Torch Vol. 1–2
The Incredible Hulk Vol. 1–17
Inhumans Vol. 1–2
The Invincible Iron Man 
Iron Fist Vol. 1–2
Ka-Zar Vol. 1–3

| valign=top |
Marvel Age (continued)
Killraven Vol. 1
Luke Cage Vol. 1–3
Marvel Rarities Vol. 1
Marvel Team-Up Vol. 1–7
Marvel Two-in-One Vol. 1–6
Ms. Marvel Vol. 1–2
Nick Fury, Agent of S.H.I.E.L.D. 
Not Brand Echh Vol. 1
Omega the Unknown Vol. 1
Rawhide Kid Vol. 1-2Savage She-Hulk Vol. 1–2Sgt. Fury and his Howling Commandos Vol. 1–4Silver Surfer Vol. 1–2Spectacular Spider-Man Vol. 1–6Spider-Woman Vol. 1–3The Mighty Thor Vol. 1–22The Sub-Mariner Vol. 1–8Tomb of Dracula Vol. 1–3Warlock Vol. 1–2Werewolf by Night Vol. 1-2The X-Men Vol. 1–8Uncanny-X-Men Vol. 1-15
|}

Table of Marvel Masterworks
This list is sorted by the order of first publication. Note that while the Uncanny X-Men, Defenders and Champions'' volumes are from the Bronze Age of Comic Books, they are listed as being Silver Age as per Marvel's categorization. When the variant and the regular cover volume are published on different dates, the regular edition date or scheduled publishing date is listed. When issues have been moved between volumes for later editions, the later edition placement is listed. The "B&N" category shows if a Barnes & Noble trade paperback is available (only 12 were published). The ISBN listed is that of the 2003 series [reboot] silver editions (not the variant/embossed foil editions).

See also
 List of comic books on CD/DVD

References

Series of books
Marvel Comics lines
Comic book collection books